The Riddle of the Sphinx is an element of Greek mythology.

Riddle of the Sphinx may also refer to:
	"It Will All Be Painfully Clear Soon Enough", Episode 7 season 2 of Legacies (TV series)  featuring the Sphinx, aired December 5 2019Riddle of the Sphinx: An Egyptian Adventure, 2000 videogameRiddle of the Sphinx 2: The Omega Stone, 2003 videogame and sequel to the 2000 game
"The Riddle of the Sphinx" (Inside No. 9), episode of the British TV series Inside No. 9The Riddle of the Sphinx, 1975 album by BloodstoneThe Riddle of the Sphinx, 2000 jazz album by Mark Gross
Riddle of the Sphinx (1982 video game), Atari 2600 VCS game by Imagic
"The Riddle of the Sphinx" (Westworld), an episode of the television series WestworldThe Riddle of the Sphinx (film), a 1921 German silent adventure film
See alsoRiddles of the Sphinx'', 1977 film